Fondazione Eni Enrico Mattei (FEEM) is a nonprofit, nonpartisan research center and think tank  based in Milan with offices in Venice and Viggiano.
FEEM is considered a leading international research center for the study of energy and environmental issues,
focusing globally on the environment, sustainable development and governance. The Foundation's mission is the research-based improvement of the quality of public and private sector decision-making.

History
Fondazione Eni Enrico Mattei was organized by members of the Ente Nazionale Idrocarburi (ENI) and others, beginning in 1982. The first board meeting occurred in 1987, setting down the principles for its activities.  Named to honor Enrico Mattei,  FEEM was formally recognized on June 7, 1989 by the President of the Italian Republic  Francesco Cossiga.

Leadership
As of 21 September 2020, Alessandro Lanza was appointed as the Executive Director of Fondazione Eni Enrico Mattei by the FEEM Board of Directors, succeeding Paolo Carnevale. The chair of FEEM's board of directors is Lucia Calvosa.

Work
Fondazione Eni Enrico Mattei carries out research and provides  objective analysis on a range of issues relating to the environment, energy and the global economy,
including mitigation and adaptation to climate change.
FEEM works with an international and interdisciplinary network of researchers in innovative programs, providing and promoting training in specialized research fields, disseminating the results of their studies through various communication channels and informing policy makers through participation in various institutional forums.

Among other activities, in April 2019 FEEM worked with the Sustainable Development Solutions Network (SDSN) to bring together a worldwide group of experts on decarbonization technologies, resulting in the report The Roadmap to 2050: A Manual for Countries to Decarbonize by Mid-Century.

External links 
 Fondazione Eni Enrico Mattei Official website (also in English)
 Fondazione Eni Enrico Mattei Working Papers, BE Press

References

Energy research institutes
Environmental research institutes
Multidisciplinary research institutes
Environmental organisations based in Italy
Research institutes in Italy
Environmental organizations established in 1989
Research institutes established in 1989
1989 establishments in Italy
International climate change organizations
Think tanks based in Italy